Derek Leaver (13 November 1930 – 24 March 2013) was an English footballer who played as an inside forward.

Leaver played for Blackburn Rovers, AFC Bournemouth and Crewe Alexandra.

He signed for Mossley from Macclesfield Town in the 1957–58 season, making seven appearances.

References

1930 births
2013 deaths
English footballers
Blackburn Rovers F.C. players
Crewe Alexandra F.C. players
English Football League players
Association football inside forwards
AFC Bournemouth players
Macclesfield Town F.C. players
Mossley A.F.C. players